Connor Murray (born 24 April 1997) is a Scottish footballer, returning to play for Queen of the South as a midfielder, having previously played for Partick Thistle.

Career

Queen of The South (First spell)
Murray started his career going through St Mirren's youth academy before signing for Queen of the South in the close season of 2015. Murray was then loaned out to Gretna 2008 on a development loan deal during the first half of the 2016–17 season to gain first-team experience. Murray played in 13 games and scored a brace in a 5–3 win versus Preston Athletic.

After returning to the Doonhamers, Murray appeared for his debut as an 89th-minute substitute versus St Mirren at the Paisley 2021 Stadium in a 3–0 win on 7 January 2017. On 28 October 2017, Murray was named as sponsor's man-of-the-match in Queens 4–2 home win over Falkirk. On 21 April 2018, he scored his first goal for the Doonhamers in a 3–0 home win versus Dundee United, having appeared as a substitute minutes before and scoring Queens third goal in the 77th minute with his first touch. Murray's current contract was to expire at the end of May 2018, but he extended his contract to remain with Queens until the end of the 2018-19 season on 30 April 2018. He signed a new one-year contract on 29 May 2019.

Partick Thistle
On 24 July 2020, Murray signed a two-year contract with Scottish League One club Partick Thistle. Murray scored his first goal for the club, scoring the winner from a corner, six minutes into a 1-0 win away to Montrose in Scottish League One.

Queen of the South (Second spell)
On 13 June 2022, Murray returned to the Doonhamers, signing a one-year contract with a further 12 month option, after leaving the Harry Wraggs.

Career statistics

Honours

Club

Partick Thistle
Scottish League One: 2020–21

References

External links
 
 

1997 births
Living people
Scottish footballers
Association football forwards
Queen of the South F.C. players
Gretna F.C. 2008 players
Scottish Professional Football League players
Footballers from Glasgow
Lowland Football League players
Partick Thistle F.C. players